The Great Western Railway Swindon Class 0-6-0 broad gauge steam locomotives for goods train work. This class was introduced into service between November 1865 and March 1866, and withdrawn between June 1887 and the end of the GWR broad gauge in May 1892. The entire class was sold to the Bristol and Exeter Railway between July 1872 and September 1874, where they were numbered 96-109, but returned to the GWR when that railway was absorbed. The locomotives were then renumbered 2077-2090;  their names were not restored.

Locomotives

Great Western Railway
 Bath (1866–1874)
 Birmingham (1866–1873)
This locomotive was named after the Midlands city, Birmingham, which was served by broad gauge trains from 1 October 1851..
 Bristol (1865–1873)
This locomotive was named after the western terminus of the railway, Bristol.
 Chester (1866–1873)
Chester never saw broad gauge trains but was served by the Great Western Railway from 1 September 1854 when it absorbed the Shrewsbury and Chester Railway.
 Gloucester (1866–1873)
Gloucester was reached over the Cheltenham and Great Western Union Railway from Swindon on 12 March 1845..
 Hereford (1866–1872)
Hereford is an English city near the Welsh border, reached on 2 June 1855 by the Hereford, Ross and Gloucester Railway.
 London (1865–1873)
This locomotive was named after the city from where the railway started, London.
 Newport (1866–1874)
Newport is on the South Wales Railway which opened on 18 June 1850.
 Oxford (1866–1874)
Oxford, home to many universities, was served by a branch line from Didcot Junction from 12 June 1844..
 Reading (1866–1874)
This locomotive was named after Reading, a large town  from London.
 Shrewsbury (1866–1872)
Shrewsbury never saw broad gauge trains but was served by the Great Western Railway from 1 September 1854 when it absorbed the Shrewsbury and Birmingham Railway.
 Swindon (1865–1874)
This locomotive was named after the town mid-way along the Great Western Railway, Swindon, where the company built its workshops.
 Windsor (1866–1873)
Windsor is the seat of the Royal Family near London and was served by a branch line from Slough that opened on 8 October 1849.
 Wolverhampton (1866–1874)
Wolverhampton is in the Midlands and home to the Great Western's Northern Division workshops. It was served by broad gauge trains from 14 November 1854.

Bristol and Exeter Railway
 96 (GWR 2077) (1872–1887)
Formerly Shrewsbury
 97 (GWR  2078) (1872–1888)
Formerly Hereford
  98 (GWR 2079) (1873–1887)
Formerly Chester
 99 (GWR 2080) (1873–1889)
Formerly Windsor
 100 (GWR 2081) (1873–1888)
Formerly London
 101 (GWR 2082) (1873–1888)
Formerly Bristol
 102 (GWR 2083) (1873–1891)
Formerly Gloucester
 103 (GWR 2084) (1873–1889)
Formerly Birmingham
 104 (GWR 2085) (1874–1889)
Formerly Wolverhampton
 105 (GWR 2086) (1874–1888)
Formerly Bath
 106 (GWR 2087) (1874–1889)
Formerly Newport
 107 (GWR 2088) (1874–1892)
Formerly Reading
  108 (GWR 2089) (1874–1889)
Formerly Oxford
 109 (GWR 2090) (1874–1888)
Formerly Swindon

References

 
 
 

Swindon
0-6-0 locomotives
Broad gauge (7 feet) railway locomotives
Railway locomotives introduced in 1865
Bristol and Exeter Railway locomotives
Scrapped locomotives